"I'm in Love with You" is a song by Tony Moran featuring American vocalist Jason Walker and released as a single in 2018, produced by Moran and co-written with Walker, Ryan Shaw, and Mike Greenly. The single marks Moran's ninth number-one, as well as Walker's fifth, on Billboard's Dance Club Songs chart, reaching the summit in the issue dated August 18, 2018.

Track listings
Digital download (Radio Mixes)
"I'm in Love with You" – 4:08
"I'm in Love with You" (Victor Dinaire/Bissen Remix) – 4:38

Charts

Weekly charts

Year-end charts

References

External links
Official video at YouTube

2018 songs
2018 singles
Electronic songs
House music songs
Songs written by Tony Moran
LGBT-related songs